The Roman Catholic Diocese of Nellore is a diocese located in the city of Nellore in the Ecclesiastical province of Visakhapatnam in India.

History
 3 July 1928: Established as Diocese of Nellore from the Metropolitan Archdiocese of Madras

Leadership
 Bishops of Nellore (Latin Rite)
 Bishop Doraboina Moses Prakasam (7 December 2006 – present)
 Bishop Prakash Mallavarapup (Apostolic Administrator 22 October 2005 – 7 December 2006)
 Bishop Pudhota Chinniah Balaswamy (17 December 1973 – 7 December 2006)
 Bishop Bala Shoury Thumma (16 March 1970 – 4 August 1973)
 Bishop William Bouter, M.H.M. (28 May 1929 – 16 March 1970)

References
 GCatholic.org
 Catholic Hierarchy

Roman Catholic dioceses in India
Christian organizations established in 1928
Roman Catholic dioceses and prelatures established in the 20th century
Christianity in Andhra Pradesh
1928 establishments in India
Nellore